Oil Creek is a stream in Cass and Jackson Counties in the U.S. state of Missouri. It is a tributary of the Little Blue River.

Oil Creek was named for small-scale oil production along its course.

See also
List of rivers of Missouri

References

Rivers of Cass County, Missouri
Rivers of Jackson County, Missouri
Rivers of Missouri